Pinking shears are scissors with saw-toothed instead of straight blades.  They produce a zigzag pattern instead of a straight edge. 

Before pinking scissors were invented, a pinking punch or pinking iron was used to punch out a decorative hem on a garment. The punch would be hammered by a mallet against a hard surface and the punch would cut through the fabric. In 1874, Eliza P. Welch patented an improved design for a pinking iron, which featured a pair of handles.

The pinking shears design that is most well known was patented by Louise Austin in 1893. In 1934, Samuel Briskman patented a pinking shear design (Felix Wyner and Edward Schulz are listed as the inventors). In 1952, Benjamin Luscalzo was granted a patent for pinking shears that would keep the blades aligned to prevent wear. 

Pinking shears are used for cutting woven cloth. Cloth edges that are unfinished will easily fray, the weave becoming undone and threads pulling out easily. The sawtooth pattern does not prevent the fraying but limits the length of the frayed thread and thus minimizes damage.

These scissors can also be used for decorative cuts and a number of patterns (arches, sawtooth of different aspect ratios, or asymmetric teeth) are available. True dressmaker's pinking shears, however, should not be used for paper decoration because paper dulls the cutting edge.

Etymology 

The cut produced by pinking shears may have been derived from the garden plant called the pink, in the genus Dianthus (the carnations). The color pink also may have been named after these flowers, although the origins of the name are not definitively known. As the pink has scalloped, or "pinked", edges to its petals, pinking shears can be thought to produce an edge similar to the flower. 

The word "pink" can be used as a verb dating back to 1300 meaning "pierce, stab, make holes in".

References

Scissors
Sewing equipment